Rondeletieae is a tribe of flowering plants in the family Rubiaceae and contains about 178 species in 8 genera. Its representatives are found from southern Mexico to northern South America and in the Caribbean.

Genera 
Currently accepted names

 Acrosynanthus Urb. (7 sp)
 Blepharidium Standl. (1 sp)
 Mazaea Krug & Urb. (2 sp)
 Phyllomelia Griseb. (1 sp)
 Rachicallis DC. (1 sp)
 Roigella Borhidi & M.Fernandez Zeq. (1 sp)
 Rondeletia L. (158 sp)
 Suberanthus Borhidi & M.Fernandez Zeq. (7 sp)

Synonyms

 Arachnimorpha Desv. ex Ham. = Rondeletia
 Ariadne Urb. = Mazaea
 Lightfootia Schreb. = Rondeletia
 Neomazaea Urb. = Mazaea
 Petesia P.Browne = Rondeletia
 Zamaria Raf. = Rondeletia

References 

 
Cinchonoideae tribes
Taxa named by Friedrich Anton Wilhelm Miquel